Caladenia attingens subsp. gracillima, commonly known as the small mantis orchid, is a species of orchid endemic to the south-west of Western Australia. It is a relatively common orchid with a single erect, hairy leaf and one or two green, yellow and red flowers. It differs from subspecies attingens in having smaller flowers and a more easterly distribution.

Description
The sides of the labellum have narrow teeth and there are four or more rows of crowded, red calli along its centre, including near its tip. Flowering occurs from August to early October.

Taxonomy and naming
Caladenia attingens was first formally described in 2001, Stephen Hopper and Andrew Phillip Brown. In the same paper, Hopper and Brown described two subspecies including Caladenia attingens subsp. gracillima and the description was published in Nuytsia. The subspecies name ("gracillima") is the comparative form of the Latin word gracilis meaning "thin" or "slender", hence "more slender", referring to the thinner sepals of this subspecies.

Distribution and habitat
The small mantis spider orchid is found between Jerramungup and Israelite Bay in the Coolgardie, Esperance Plains and Mallee biogeographic regions where it grows near creeks, granite outcrops and salt lakes.

Conservation
Caladenia attingens subsp. gracillima is classified as "not threatened" by the Western Australian Government Department of Parks and Wildlife.

References

attingens subsp. gracillima
Orchids of Western Australia
Endemic orchids of Australia
Plants described in 2001
Taxa named by Stephen Hopper
Taxa named by Andrew Phillip Brown